ASUM may stand for:

Organizations 
All Saints University of Medicine, a medical school in Aruba
Amateur Swimming Union of Malaysia, a national governing body

See also 
Åsum (disambiguation)